Patrick Michael Dewan (December 23, 1890 – 1988) was an Ontario farmer and politician. He represented the Oxford in the Legislative Assembly of Ontario from 1934 to 1943 as a Liberal member.

He was born in Osgoode Township, Ontario (now Ottawa, Ontario), the son of John Joseph Dewan, and was educated at Willis Business College in Ottawa, the University of Ottawa, St. Francis Xavier University in Nova Scotia and the Ontario Agricultural College in Guelph. In 1921, Dewan married Margaret Olive Tierney. He served as alderman for Woodstock and was also secretary-treasurer of the Woodstock Agricultural Society. Dewan served as Minister of Agriculture in the provincial cabinet from 1937 to 1943.

References 
 Canadian Parliamentary Guide, 1937, AL Normandin

External links 

1890 births
1988 deaths
Members of the Executive Council of Ontario
Ontario Liberal Party MPPs
Politicians from Ottawa